Spinochrome can refer to any of a series of chemical compounds:

 Spinochrome B (2,3,5,7-tetrahydroxy-1,4-naphthalenedione)
 Spinochrome D (2,3,5,6,8-Pentahydroxy-1,4-naphthalenedione)
 Spinochrome E (hexahydroxy-1,4-naphthalenedione)